La Figurita is a barrio (neighbourhood or district) of Montevideo, Uruguay. It is home to the Hospital Español.

Location
It borders Reducto and Atahualpa to the west, Brazo Oriental to the north, Jacinto Vera to the east, La Comercial and Villa Muñoz to the south.

Places of worship
 Parish Church of Our Lady of Sorrows, popularly known as "Iglesia del Reducto" Garibaldi 1667 (Roman Catholic)
 Parish Church of St Michael Archangel, Concepción Arenal 1893 (Roman Catholic)
 Church of the Resurrection, Ramón del Valle Inclán 2261 esq. Colorado (Russian Orthodox)

See also 
Barrios of Montevideo

References

External links 
 Intendencia de Montevideo / Historia de La Figurita
 Revista Raices / Historia del barrio La Figurita

Barrios of Montevideo